ISO 3166-2:SE is the entry for Sweden in ISO 3166-2, part of the ISO 3166 standard published by the International Organization for Standardization (ISO), which defines codes for the names of the principal subdivisions (e.g., provinces or states) of all countries coded in ISO 3166-1.

Currently for Sweden, ISO 3166-2 codes are defined for 21 counties.

Each code consists of two parts, separated by a hyphen. The second part is one or two letters, which is the alphabetic code of the county, and was used in vehicle registration plates until 1973.

Current codes
Subdivision names are listed as in the ISO 3166-2 standard published by the ISO 3166 Maintenance Agency (ISO 3166/MA).

In ISO 3166-2, the numeric code (länskod) of each county is shown for information purposes in square brackets after the name of the county. However, these alternative code elements are not official ISO 3166-2 codes, since this part of ISO 3166 does not allow for duplicate coding of identical subdivisions.

Subdivision names are sorted in Swedish alphabetical order: a-z, å, ä, ö.

Click on the button in the header to sort each column.

Counties

Changes
The following changes to the entry have been announced in newsletters by the ISO 3166/MA since the first publication of ISO 3166-2 in 1998:

See also
 Subdivisions of Sweden
 FIPS region codes of Sweden
 NUTS codes of Sweden

External links
 ISO Online Browsing Platform: SE
 Counties of Sweden, Statoids.com

2:SE
ISO 3166-2
Sweden geography-related lists